Divine light is the concept that God's presence has aspects of illumination.

Divine light may also refer to:

 Tabor Light
 Divine Light Mission
 Emissaries of Divine Light

See also
 Light of God (disambiguation)